The following is a list of released songs recorded and performed by Aaron Carter.

External links
Facebook — Aaron Carter on Facebook
 List of songs recorded by Aaron Carter on Myspace

References

 
Carter, Aaron